Elias Zerhouni (in Arabic إلياس زرهوني) (born April 12, 1951) is an Algerian-born American scientist, radiologist and biomedical engineer.

He spent much of his career on the faculty of the Johns Hopkins University School of Medicine, serving as its executive vice-dean from 1995 to 2002. He was the 15th Director of the National Institutes of Health from May 2, 2002, to October 31, 2008, under the George W. Bush administration.  In 2009, under the Obama administration he served as one of the country's first presidential science envoys to foster scientific and technologic collaboration with other nations. He also served as a senior fellow for the Bill and Melinda Gates Foundation from 2009 through 2010.  From 2011 until his retirement in April 2018, he was the President for Global Research and Development at the pharmaceutical company Sanofi.

Background
A resident of Pasadena, Maryland, Zerhouni was born in Nedroma, Algeria. Having earned his M.D. degree at the University of Algiers, School of Medicine in 1975, Zerhouni emigrated to the United States to take up a residency position in diagnostic radiology at Johns Hopkins School of Medicine. He went on to positions of increasing responsibility, including chief resident and assistant professor.  He then served as vice chair of the Department of Radiology at Eastern Virginia Medical School and its affiliated DePaul Hospital from 1981 to 1985. In 1985, Zerhouni returned to Johns Hopkins as an associate professor. He was appointed Director of the MRI Division in 1988, subsequently becoming chair of the Russell H. Morgan Department of Radiology and Radiological Science, Martin Donner Professor of Radiology and Professor of Biomedical Engineering. Ultimately, Zerhouni was appointed as Executive Vice-Dean of the Johns Hopkins School of Medicine in 1996 and served as Dean of Research and Dean for Clinical Affairs until 2002 at which time he moved to the Directorship of the NIH.

Zerhouni is a highly published scientist in his field, inventor, and entrepreneur. His work led to advances in Computed Tomography (CAT scanning) and Magnetic Resonance Imaging (MRI) that resulted in over 200 peer reviewed publications and 8 patents. Partly based on this research and research and subsequent inventions, Zerhouni founded or co-founded five start-up companies. He founded Computerized Imaging Reference Systems (CIRS) in 1982, where he served as chairman for several years. He founded Advanced Medical Imaging in 1989, which was later sold to a major public company. He is a co-inventor and co-founder of Biopsys Corporation which became public before being acquired J&J in 1997. He co-founded American Radiology Services in 1996 and served as its chairman and CEO until 2002. He is also a co-inventor and co-founder of Surgivision, Inc., an MRI image-guided surgery company.

National Institutes of Health (2002–2008)
Zerhouni was appointed Director of the National Institutes of Health (NIH) by President George W. Bush. Confirmed by the Senate in April 2002, he served until October 2008. As director, Zerhouni convened a series of meetings to chart a "Roadmap for Medical Research" in the 21st century  to identify opportunities and gaps in biomedical research. Zerhouni also created the Research, Condition, and Disease Categorization Process (RCDC), an online system which reports NIH research investments visible to the public.

During Zerhouni's tenure, the NIH Reform Act of 2006 was enacted by Congress. The Act codified the NIH Common Fund and new governance mechanisms for the agency, and codified a new NIH division, the Division of Program Coordination, Planning, and Strategic Initiatives (DPCPSI), to administrate the Common Fund.  During his tenure at NIH, Zerhouni created the Neuroscience Blueprint, and revised the NIH peer review system.

He currently sits on the Board of the Foundation for the National Institutes of Health.

Scientific adviser
In 2009, under the Obama administration, he served as one of the country's first presidential science envoys to foster scientific and technologic collaboration with other nations. He also served as a senior fellow for the Bill and Melinda Gates Foundation from 2009 through 2010.

Zerhouni has served as a science advisor reviewing several national research programs for France, Canada, Australia, Qatar, among others. In 2008, he was asked by the French minister of Health and the French Minister of Research and Higher Education to lead a Committee that led to the creation of the AVIESAN in 2009.

President, Global R&D of Sanofi
Sanofi, a global pharmaceutical company, named Dr. Zerhouni as the Global Head of Research and Development in 2011. He retired from Sanofi in June 2018.

Awards and international recognition
Zerhouni has advised many world leaders and has won various awards. In 1985, he was a consultant to the White House under President Ronald Reagan. In 1988, he was a consultant to the World Health Organization. In 2000, Zerhouni was elected to the National Academy of Sciences' Institute of Medicine and in 2013 was elected to the National Academy of Engineering, one of only a handful of scientists which have been elected to both august bodies.  He received the Légion d'honneur from the French National Order and President Nicolas Sarkozy in 2008. Zerhouni has also served on the National Cancer Institute's Board of Scientific Advisors prior to his becoming NIH director. He has won several awards for his research including a Gold Medal from the American Roentgen Ray Society and the Radiological Society of North American and two Paul Lauterbur Awards for MRI research. Zerhouni received the honorary title Doctor Emeritus from the University of Algiers in 2005. In 2008, he received the Golden Plate Award of the American Academy of Achievement. Since leaving the NIH, Zerhouni has been appointed to the boards of the Lasker Foundation, Research!America, and the Mayo Clinic. He joined the board of trustees for King Abdullah University of Science and Technology (KAUST) when the school opened in September 2009. He was also named by the Maryland Governor to the chairmanship of the Maryland Economic Development Commission. In 2010, Zerhouni received an honorary degree from Johns Hopkins University and the Woodrow Wilson award for service to the university and the nation. He is a recipient of the Ben Franklin Medal.  Zerhouni was the founding Chief Scientific Advisor of Science -Translational Medicine, a sister publication of Science Magazine of the American Association for the Advancement of Science (AAAS). He served on the boards of Actelion Pharmaceuticals, a Swiss biotechnology company and Danaher, a US company comprising a family of more than 20 global operating companies in the fields of life sciences and the environment. He was appointed as Chair of Innovation at the College de France in 2011 and elected to membership at the French Academy of Medicine in 2010.

References

External links

KAUST Board of Trustees

1951 births
Living people
Directors of the National Institutes of Health
American radiologists
Algerian emigrants to the United States
American people of Algerian-Berber descent
American Muslims
Zerhounia, Elias
Chevaliers of the Légion d'honneur
University of Algiers alumni
Algerian academics
Algerian radiologists
People from Nedroma
Sanofi people
Members of the National Academy of Medicine
George W. Bush administration personnel